The 2016 Australia Day Honours were announced on 26 January 2016 by the Governor General of Australia, Sir Peter Cosgrove.

The Australia Day Honours are the first of the two major annual honours lists, announced on Australia Day (26 January), with the other being the Queen's Birthday Honours which are announced on the second Monday in June.

Order of Australia

Companion of the Order of Australia (AC)

General Division

Officer of the Order of Australia (AO)

General Division

Member of the Order of Australia (AM)

General Division

Military Division

Medal of the Order of Australia (OAM)

General Division

Military Division

Meritorious Service

Public Service Medal (PSM)

Australian Police Medal (APM)

Australian Fire Service Medal (AFSM)

Ambulance Service Medal (ASM)

Emergency Services Medal (ESM)

Distinguished Service

Second Bar to the Distinguished Service Cross (DSC and 2 Bars)

Bar to the Distinguished Service Cross (DSC and Bar)

Distinguished Service Cross (DSC)

Distinguished Service Medal (DSM)

Commendation for Distinguished Service

Conspicuous Service Cross (CSC)

Bar to the Conspicuous Service Medal (CSM and Bar)

Conspicuous Service Medal (CSM)

References

External links
 Australian Honours Lists, www.gg.gov.au
 Australia Day 2016 Honours Lists, www.gg.gov.au
Summaries:
 S1 - Order of Australia
 S2 - Meritorious 
 S3 - Distinguished and Conspicuous  
Australia Day 2016 Honours Lists - Biographical notes:
 Companion (AC) in the General Division of the Order of Australia 
 Officer (AO) in the General Division of the Order of Australia
 Member (AM) in the General Division of the Order of Australia (A-L) 
 Member (AM) in the General Division of the Order of Australia (M-Z) 
 Member (AM) and Medal (OAM) of the Military Division of the Order of Australia 
 Medal (OAM) of the Order of Australia in the General Division (A-E) 
 Medal (OAM) of the Order of Australia in the General Division (F-L) 
 Medal (OAM) of the Order of Australia in the General Division (M-R) 
 Medal (OAM) of the Order of Australia in the General Division (S-Z) 
 Meritorious – PSM, APM, AFSM, ASM & ESM 
 Military – Gallantry, Distinguished & Conspicuous 

2016 awards in Australia
Orders, decorations, and medals of Australia